Wu Bong, born Jacob Perl, was a Zen master in the Kwan Um School of Zen. Perl was the head teacher of the European Kwan Um School of Zen. The first student of Seungsahn in the United States, he had previously practiced Zen in the Sōtō tradition at the San Francisco Zen Center under Shunryū Suzuki. He also spent one year studying the Nyingma school of Tibetan Buddhism at the Tibetan Nyingmapa Meditation Center in Berkeley, California under Tarthang Tulku.

Born in Poland, he and Seungsahn established the first Zen center ever to exist in his home country in 1978. In 1983 Perl was made a Ji Do Poep Sa Nim in the Kwan Um School—granting him some teaching responsibilities—and in 1993 he received dharma transmission from Seungsahn, making him an independent Zen master. Perl's wife, Grazyna Perl (Bonyo), is also a Zen master in the Kwan Um School of Zen. The pair moved to Paris in 1995 and established the Paris Zen Center.

In 2009, Wubong became a bhikṣu. He died while leading a zen retreat in Paris on April 17, 2013.

Other media

Video

 Don't Know - A tribute to Zen Master Wu Bong, by Fabio Dondero and Chiara Somajni, 2016 (Video on demand, Documentary webpage)

See also
Buddhism in Europe
Buddhism in the United States
Timeline of Zen Buddhism in the United States

Notes

References

External links
http://www.kwanumzen.org/
http://zen.kwanumeurope.org/
Transmission speech
Leave Your Mind Alone
Not Difficult, Not Easy
Ecology of Mind
The pilgrimage to awakening

San Francisco Zen Center
Seon Buddhist monks
Kwan Um School of Zen
Polish Zen Buddhists
2013 deaths
1950 births